The Evening Star was a daily (except Sunday) newspaper published in the twin towns of Boulder and Kalgoorlie, Western Australia from 1898 to 1921.

History
The paper was initially printed and published by Osgood & Co. at the offices of The Evening Star, Burt Street, Boulder City and Hannan Street, Kalgoorlie.

The last editor was Dave Georgeson, who left the State on holiday shortly before the last issue went to press. 
Georgeson was subsequently sub-editor of The Courier, Brisbane.

The business of The Evening Star Co. Ltd was wound up in April 1921.

Digitisation
Most issues from Vol. 1 No. 2 (22 March 1898) to Vol. 21 No. 7226 (26 February 1921) of The Evening Star have been digitised as part of the Australian Newspapers Digitisation Program of the National Library of Australia, and may be accessed vie Trove.

References

Defunct newspapers published in Western Australia
1898 establishments in Australia
1921 disestablishments in Australia
Daily newspapers published in Australia
Newspapers on Trove
Newspapers published in Goldfields-Esperance